Hairtown is an unincorporated community located in the Anderson Creek Township of Harnett County, North Carolina.

References

Unincorporated communities in Harnett County, North Carolina
Unincorporated communities in North Carolina